Stefan Read (born May 7, 1987) is a Canadian ski jumper. Competing in two Winter Olympics, he earned his best finish of 12th in the team large hill event at Vancouver in 2010.

Early life
Read was born in Edmonton, Alberta. He began downhill skiing at an early age. He attended the National Sport School.

Career
Read began competing in ski jumping in 2002. In 2004 he finished 27th at a Continental Cup in Lahti, Finland, which qualified him to take part in Olympic competition.

Read competed in both the normal hill and the K120m Large Hill events at the 2006 Olympic Games in Turin, Italy, placing 20th and 47th respectively.

His best result in the World Cup so far is a 23rd place at Zakopane in 2006. Read's best finish at the FIS Nordic World Ski Championships was 12th in the team large hill event at Sapporo in 2007.

References

External links

1987 births
Living people
Canadian male ski jumpers
Olympic ski jumpers of Canada
Ski jumpers at the 2006 Winter Olympics
Ski jumpers at the 2010 Winter Olympics
Sportspeople from Edmonton